G. C. Edmondson was the working name of science fiction author Garry Edmonson (full name "José Mario Garry Ordoñez Edmondson y Cotton") (October 11, 1922 in Washington state – December 14, 1995 in San Diego, California). According to the obituary published in Locus Magazine, Edmondson was born in Rachauchitlán, Tabasco, Mexico. During World War II he served as a U. S. Marine.

Although generally called a science fiction writer, he wrote Westerns using the names Kelly P. Gast, J. B. Masterson, and Jack Logan. As he could also speak six languages he did translating work as well. His science fiction career began during 1955 with a story in the magazine Astounding. He later produced several novels which gained some note for their interest in time travel and Latin America. Several writers, including Gardner Dozois, tend to consider him as a neglected author.

Bibliography

Novels
The Ship That Sailed the Time Stream (1965) Nebula Award nominee for Best Novel
Chapayeca also published as Blue Face (1972)
T.H.E.M. (1974)
The Aluminum Man (1975) 
The Man Who Corrupted Earth (1980)
To Sail the Century Sea (1981)

Novels written with C. M. Kotlan
The Takeover (1984)
The Cunningham Equations (1986) 
The Black Magician (1986)
Maximum Effort (1987)

Collections
Stranger Than You Think (1965)

External resources
 
 Biographical information at George C. Willick's SPACEFLIGHT

References

External links
 
  
 

1922 births
1995 deaths
20th-century American novelists
American male novelists
American science fiction writers
American male short story writers
20th-century American short story writers
20th-century American male writers
United States Marine Corps personnel of World War II